Chunkara (Aymara for "pointed mountain", hispanicized spellings Chuncara, Chuncará, Chungara, Chungará) may refer to:

 Chunkara (Arequipa), a mountain in the Arequipa Region, Peru
 Chunkara (Bolivia), a mountain in Bolivia
 Chunkara (Puno), a mountain in the Puno Region, Peru
 Chungara (journal), a Chilean academic journal
 Chungará Lake, a lake in Chile

See also 
 Chungara–Tambo Quemado
 Chunkarani
 Hatun Chunkara